Joseph Paelinck, (20 March 1781 – 19 June 1839) was a painter from the Southern Netherlands.

Biography
Paelinck attended the Royal Academy of Fine Arts (Ghent) and then with Jacques-Louis David in Paris, where he painted in 1804 A Judgment of Paris, which earned him his first Academy Art Award for Ghent. After he had worked there a short time as a teacher, he went to Rome and stayed there for five years. He painted, among other things: Rome under Augustus for the Quirinal Palace and the Discovery of the Cross for St. Michael's Church in Ghent. He was later a professor at the Académie royale de peinture et de sculpture in Brussels.

His many pupils included Charles Baugniet, François Antoine Bodumont, Edouard de Bièfve, Élisa de Gamond, Félix De Vigne, Jean Joseph Geens, Jozef Geirnaert, Joseph Meganck, Fanny Paelinck-Horgnies, Alfred Stevens, Joseph Cohen de Vries and  Abraham Johannes Zeeman.

Paintings

References

External links 

 

18th-century Flemish painters
19th-century Flemish painters
1781 births
1839 deaths
Artists from Brussels